Redcliff is a town in southern Alberta, Canada. Adjacent to the City of Medicine Hat to the east and Cypress County to the west and north, the town is bisected by Highway 1 (Trans-Canada Highway) and is located on the north bank of the South Saskatchewan River.

Situated at a high elevation relative to the surrounding landscape, the Town of Redcliff offers views of the South Saskatchewan River valley, the City of Medicine Hat, and Cypress Hills. The cliffs that overlook the river valley resemble badland formations.

History 

Redcliff's history began in the 1880s with the discovery of abundant coal and natural gas reserves. Access to this inexpensive resource led to Redcliff being promoted as the "Smokeless manufacturing centre of the West". This drew industries that manufactured diverse products such as shoes, gloves, cigars, trucks, bricks, glass, and flour among others. In June 1915, a tornado (at the time called a cyclone) ravaged several of these businesses, thus starting a decline in Redcliff's economy. World War I and a flu epidemic ended the economic prosperity. The community experienced a resurgence in growth following World War II.

Name

The name of the town originated from the elevated red shale banks of the South Saskatchewan River. Currently, Redcliff is spelled as one word without an 'E', however historically it has been spelled Redcliffe, Red Cliff, and Red-Cliff.

Originally, the town was slated to be named Stonerville, after the town's doctor.

Demographics 

In the 2016 Census of Population conducted by Statistics Canada, the Town of Redcliff recorded a population of 5,600 living in 2,159 of its 2,232 total private dwellings, a  change from its 2011 population of 5,588.

Economy 

The primary industries that support the local economy relate to oil and gas and the climate of southern Alberta. Numerous businesses in Redcliff and area provide drilling and pipeline services to support the oil and gas industry. The area's sunny climate and abundance of affordable natural gas reserves has contributed to the establishment of a sizable greenhouse industry. Greenhouse products include vegetables (sweet bell peppers, beefsteak tomatoes, tomatoes on the vine, and long English cucumbers), a variety of flowering plants, and some trees.

In the past, Redcliff was known for the production of glass, brick and pottery products. Some of these factories have since moved to Medicine Hat, such as the IXL brick plant, while others are no longer in existence.

Redcliff is a member of the Economic Development Alliance of Southeast Alberta.

Culture 
Redcliff Museum
Redcliff Public Library

Attractions 

Redcliff has the following attractions:
an aquatic centre featuring a heated  outdoor pool with varying depths and a heated children's pool with a water play structure;
the Redcliff Rectangle, a multi-purpose ice hockey facility;
a curling rink featuring three sheets of ice;
six parks including the  River Valley Park adjacent to the South Saskatchewan River that features a kitchen, washrooms, firepit, and walking trails;
the 18-hole Riverview Golf Course adjacent to the Riverview residential subdivision and the cliffs of the South Saskatchewan River valley; 
the Redcliff Campground that has capacity for 48 units;
four softball/baseball diamonds of various sizes; and
a BMX track.
a skate park.

Education 
The Prairie Rose School Division No. 8 operates the following four schools in Redcliff that provide programming for children from kindergarten through grade 12.

Isabel F. Cox Elementary School (K–3)
Margaret Wooding Elementary School (4–6)
Parkside Junior High School (7–9)
Redcliff Mennonite Alternative Program Outreach School (K-12)

High school students attend Eagle Butte High School in Dunmore, or enter the Medicine Hat School District No. 76 or Medicine Hat Catholic Separate Regional Division No. 20 for grades 10 through 12.

See also 
List of communities in Alberta
List of towns in Alberta

References

External links 

1910 establishments in Alberta
Towns in Alberta
Populated places on the South Saskatchewan River